Rui Pedro Reis Batalha (born 29 June 1996 in Santo Isidoro, Mafra) is a Portuguese footballer who plays for Real S.C. as a forward.

Football career
On 21 January 2015, Batalha made his professional debut with Gil Vicente in a 2014–15 Taça da Liga match against Marítimo.

References

External links

1996 births
Living people
Sportspeople from Cascais
Portuguese footballers
Association football forwards
Gil Vicente F.C. players
S.C.U. Torreense players
Real S.C. players